Father of the Bride is a 1950 American comedy film about a man trying to cope with preparations for his daughter's wedding starring Spencer Tracy, Joan Bennett, and Elizabeth Taylor. Directed by Vincente Minnelli, it was adapted by Frances Goodrich and Albert Hackett from the 1949 novel by Edward Streeter. Father of the Bride was nominated for Academy Awards for Best Actor in a Leading Role, Best Picture, and Best Writing, Screenplay.

Plot

In the aftermath of the wedding of his daughter Kay (Elizabeth Taylor), Stanley T. Banks (Spencer Tracy), a successful middle-aged lawyer, recalls the day three months earlier when he first learned of her engagement to Buckley (Don Taylor). Kay's casual announcement at the dinner table of the family's comfortable suburban home that she is in love with him and has accepted his proposal makes Stanley feel uneasy, but he soon recognizes that his daughter has grown up and the wedding is inevitable. While Ellie (Joan Bennett), Kay's mother, immediately begins making preparations, Stanley lies awake at night, fearing the worst for his daughter.

Stanley's misgivings about the marriage eventually make Ellie anxious.  Stanley insists that Kay present Buckley for a financial sit-down. She calls the tradition "old-fashioned rigamarole," but produces him nevertheless. After spending the entire time talking about himself Stanley is pleased to learn later from Ellie that the young man is the head of his own small company and indeed is capable of providing a comfortable life for Kay. The Bankses' first meeting with Buckley's wealthy parents, Doris and Herbert Dunstan, starts awkwardly, careens animatedly, then tails off when Stanley drinks too much and falls asleep upright on their couch.

Stanley misses out on Kay and Buckley's engagement party, marooned in the kitchen playing bartender.  In its wake he realizes that any hope for a small wedding has been swept aside, and there will be no escaping paying for an extravagant affair "with all the trimmings."  As costs for the June event spiral out of control, Stanley calculates that he can afford to accommodate no more than one hundred-and-fifty guests. The task of paring down the list proves too difficult for everyone involved, however, and he reluctantly consents to an extra one-hundred. Growing rattled, he suggests to Kay that she and Buckley elope. Kay is at first shocked by the suggestion, but has a change of heart that she shares with her mother. Ellie, who has long mourned never having had the wedding planned for Kay, strongly disapproves.  Quick on his feet, Stanley plays it off as if it had been Kay's idea.

Wedding plans continue to snowball until the day that Buckley tells Kay he'd like them to go fishing together in Nova Scotia for their honeymoon. Kay is appalled, and calls off the wedding.  The standoff is short, each betrothed apologizing to the other, and soon the two families begin wedding rehearsals. 

On the big day chaos reigns at the Banks home during final preparations for the reception there. The wedding ceremony brings both joy and sorrow to Stanley, as he concedes that his daughter is now a woman and no longer his child. During the reception Stanley tries to find Kay so he can kiss the bride but only manages to see her leaving in a spray of confetti. Afterwards, Ellie and Stanley survey the mess in their home and concur that the entire affair was a great success. Kay calls and tells her father she loves him and thanks her parents for everything they have done for her.

Cast

Production 
According to Frank Miller for TCM, when creating the role for the father, the character was shaped around Spencer Tracy. Minnelli believed Tracy was capable of handling a role that balanced humor with fatherly tenderness. After some miscommunication with the producers, Jack Benny was brought in for a reading. He was too comedic and couldn’t handle the dramatic aspects of the film. When Tracy heard another actor was being tested, he turned down the movie. Minnelli asked Katharine Hepburn to invite Tracy to a dinner party where he later convinced Tracy to join the production.

Tracy then wanted Hepburn for his screen wife, but it was felt that they were too romantic a team to play a happily domesticated couple with children, so Joan Bennett, who had previously co-starred with Hepburn in the 1933 film version of Little Women and Tracy in  the 1932 motion pictures She Wanted a Millionaire and Me and My Gal, got the part.

Release
The film premiered on May 18, 1950 at Radio City Music Hall in New York City. The premiere of Father of the Bride took place 12 days after Elizabeth Taylor's real-life marriage to her first husband Nicky Hilton, an event that MGM exploited in its publicity campaign for the picture. Helen Rose, who designed Taylor's gown for the film, also designed her wedding gown.

Reception
Reviews from critics were generally positive. Bosley Crowther of The New York Times called the film "equally wonderful" when compared to the book, with "all the warmth and poignancy and understanding that makes the Streeter treatise much beloved." Of Tracy's performance Crowther wrote, "As a father, torn by jealousy, devotion, pride and righteous wrath, Mr. Tracy is tops." Variety called it "the second strong comedy in a row for Spencer Tracy," with "plenty to enjoy during the speedy 92 minutes." Harrison's Reports wrote, "Crammed with laughs, it is a mirthful, warmly appealing entertainment that is sure to be a crowd pleaser." Richard L. Coe of The Washington Post called it "a cheerful package of smiles and laughter. You'll enjoy it." John McCarten of The New Yorker was more dismissive of the film, calling the jokes "rather wheezy, and they certainly don't do much to speed up the picture. Since the plot consists simply of outlining the difficulties of putting on a wedding, including, of course, the damnable expense of it all, it grows a little tiresome after a half hour or so."

The film was one of the top-grossing films of the year, earning $6,084,000 worldwide ($4,036,000 in the US and Canada and $2,048,000 overseas), a fivefold return on its $1,215,000 budget. It did so well that MGM registered the title Now I'm a Grandfather and negotiated rights for a sequel with Streeter.

Sequels and adaptations

Pleased with the commercial and critical success of Father of the Bride, MGM rushed a sequel into production the following year, called Father's Little Dividend, in which Taylor's character has a baby. It did almost as well as the original film and was also made into a television series which aired on CBS during the 1961-62 season and featured Leon Ames (Stan), Ruth Warrick (Ellie), and Myrna Fahey (Kay).

In 1991 a remake by the same name was made starring Steve Martin, Diane Keaton and Kimberly Williams as the bride. It produced the  sequel, Father of the Bride Part II, in 1995, with the same cast. As in the original's sequel, the bride gives birth to her first child, also a son. The film was also remade in Tamil as Abhiyum Naanum, and in Kannada as Naanu Nanna Kanasu.

In February 2018, The Hollywood Reporter revealed that remakes of several films are in development as exclusive content for Walt Disney Studios' Disney+. One of those projects named in the announcement is Father of the Bride.

On September 24, 2020, Warner Bros. announced their plans for a remake starring a Hispanic family, with the script being penned by Matt Lopez. It was released on June 16, 2022, by Warner Bros. Pictures and HBO Max

Recognition
The film was featured in Peter Bogdanovich's 1971 picture The Last Picture Show, being screened in the local movie theater.

The film is recognized by American Film Institute in these lists:
 2000: AFI's 100 Years...100 Laughs – #83

Home media
The original negative was destroyed in a fire in 1978, and all home media released have been sourced from a fine grain master positive. The film was released on DVD in June 2004. It was given an extensive digital restoration and released on Blu-ray by the Warner Archive Collection in May 2016.

Notes

External links

 
 
 
 
 

Father of the Bride (franchise)
1950 films
1950 romantic comedy films
American romantic comedy films
American black-and-white films
Films adapted into television shows
Films based on American novels
Films about families
Films about weddings
Films shot in California
Metro-Goldwyn-Mayer films
Films directed by Vincente Minnelli
Films produced by Pandro S. Berman
Films scored by Adolph Deutsch
Films about father–daughter relationships
1950s English-language films
1950s American films